Contenido is a Mexican monthly general interest magazine covering articles on the experience of people. The magazine was founded in 1963. The headquarters of the magazine, which is published by Editorial Contenido S.A. DE C.V., is in Mexico City. The magazine is similar to Reader's Digest.

References

External links
 
 WorldCat record

1963 establishments in Mexico
Lifestyle magazines
Magazines established in 1963
Magazines published in Mexico
Mass media in Mexico City
Monthly magazines published in Mexico
Spanish-language magazines